The Anglican Church of All Saints in Rodden, Somerset, England, was built in 1640. It is a Grade II* listed building.

History
The church was built in 1640, on the site of an earlier medieval church. Although it served only a small community, the church was built on the orders of Archbishop William Laud. He was an autocratic clergyman and sought to reduce the influence of Puritans, after which Laudianism is named.

The date this arrangement ended, and Rodden became a separate parish, is unclear. It is described as a chapelry in a correction note to the 1811 Census but the 1831 Census Abstract states the separation occurred in 1784. John Collinson, published in 1791, has Rodden as a chapelry of Boyton. Another source gives the creation date of Rodden ecclesiastical parish as 1802.

The church was rebuilt in a Victorian restoration in the mid-19th century.

The benefice was united with that of Berkley in 1964. Today the parish is part of the benefice of Beckington with Standerwick, Berkley, Lullington, Orchardleigh and Rodden, which was created in 1978, within the Diocese of Bath and Wells.

Architecture

The stone building has a three-bay nave and one-bay chancel with tile roofs. The west tower is supported by diagonal buttresses. The majority of the interior dates from its restoration in the 19th century, but it retains its 18th-century pulpit.

Present day

The church, in spite of its isolated location, continues to have services once or twice a month.

See also
 List of ecclesiastical parishes in the Diocese of Bath and Wells

References

Further reading
 

Grade II* listed buildings in South Somerset
Grade II* listed churches in Somerset
Church of England church buildings in South Somerset